The Wavelength 24 is an American trailerable sailboat that was designed by Paul Lindenberg as a Midget Ocean Racing Club (MORC) racer and first built in 1982.

Production
The design was built by W. D. Schock Corp in the United States, with initial production running from 1982 to 1990, with 87 boats delivered. Production was restarted in 2005, but by 2021 it was out of production once again.

Design
The Wavelength 24 is a recreational keelboat, built predominantly of fiberglass, with wood trim. It has a masthead sloop rig, a raked stem, a walk-through reverse transom, an internally mounted spade-type rudder controlled by a tiller and a fixed fin keel. It displaces  and carries  of lead ballast.

The reintroduced 2005 version incorporated some design changes including an optional wing keel, as well as hammock style bunks with storage underneath.

The boat is normally fitted with a small  cockpit well-mounted outboard motor for docking and maneuvering.

The original interior design has sleeping accommodation for four people, with a double "V"-berth in the bow cabin and two straight settee berths in the main cabin. The galley is located on the starboard side just aft of the companionway ladder. The galley is equipped with a pull-out two-burner stove and a sink. The head is located in the bow cabin under the "V"-berth.

Operational history
The boat is supported by an active class club, the Wavelength 24 Owners Group.

In a 2010 review Steve Henkel wrote, "Paul Lindenberg, a designer who specializes in lightweight racing sailboats, drew this vessel for W. D. Schock, and she was built from 1983 to 1992, and then recently reintroduced as a newly remodeled version. The new version has hammock-style bunks amidships which are lightweight, provide good support and comfort when racing, and give excellent access to the storage space under them. The boat appears to be remarkably similar to the Santana 23, a Shad Turner design for Schock, built from 1978 to 1987 ... The Wavelength comes with either a winged or standard fin keel, and looks like she should go fast with either keel setup. Best features: An open transom, similar to the Santana 23's, provides good access to an outboard engine, and ensures adequate drainage of water slopping onto the cockpit sole. Worst features: If we were in the market for a racing boat of this size and were tempted by the Wavelength, we might opt instead for the near clone, the Santana 23D because of its extra nine inches of headroom, and its lifting keel, which makes launching from a trailer infinitely easier than dealing with a fin keel at the ramp."

See also
List of sailing boat types

References

External links

Keelboats
1980s sailboat type designs
Sailing yachts
Trailer sailers
Sailboat type designs by Paul Lindenberg
Sailboat types built by W. D. Schock Corp